Frederikke Gulmark (born 16 July 1992) is a Danish handball player who currently plays for Lyngby HK.

References

1994 births
Living people
People from Rudersdal Municipality
Danish female handball players
Sportspeople from the Capital Region of Denmark
21st-century Danish women